Redlight is the second studio album by American experimental rock band Grails, released on Neurot Recordings in 2004 as a follow up to The Burden of Hope

Track listing
All songs written by Grails, except Track 1, which is a Traditional song.

Personnel
Grails
Emil Amos – Drums, steel guitar
Alex Hall – Guitar
Zak Riles – Guitar, keyboards, dulcimer, lap steel guitar
William Slater – Piano, bass, electric piano, guitar
Timothy Horner – Violin

References

2004 albums
Grails (band) albums
Neurot Recordings albums